The 2013–2014 Season of Mansfield Town F.C. was its first back in the Football League, following promotion as champions from the Blue Square Bet Premier at the end of the 2012–13 season. The club also took part in the FA Cup, the League Cup and the Football League Trophy. The club played its home games at Field Mill, renamed the One Call Stadium for sponsorship reasons, the oldest ground in the Football League.

Goal scorers

Transfers

In

Out

Pre-season

Tour of Malta

Green Energy Cup
† Trialist, ‡ Youth Team player

Other friendlies
† Trialist, ‡ Youth Team player

League Two

2013

August

September

October

November

December

2014

January

February

March

April

May

League table

FA Cup

League Cup

Football League Trophy

Reserves

References

Mansfield Town F.C. seasons
Mansfield Town